The 1976–77 Kentucky Wildcats men's basketball team represented University of Kentucky in the 1976–77 NCAA Division I men's basketball season. This was the first season Kentucky played in Rupp Arena.

Schedule

References 

Kentucky Wildcats men's basketball seasons
Kentucky
Kentucky
Kentucky Wildcats
Kentucky Wildcats